Polytaenia is a genus of flowering plants belonging to the family Apiaceae.

Its native range is the central and south-eastern United States.

Species:
 Polytaenia albiflora E.L.Keith 
 Polytaenia nuttallii DC. 
 Polytaenia texana (J.M.Coult. & Rose) Mathias & Constance

References

Apioideae
Apioideae genera